The National Photography Museum is a Moroccan art museum dedicated to photography located in Rabat, Morocco, within the repurposed 19th century Burj Kebir Fortress. This museum was initiated by the National Museums Foundation in Morocco and inaugurated on January 14, 2020.

Location 

The National Photography Museum is located within the remains of the Burj Kebir Fortress, also known as Fort Rottembourg. The fort was constructed from 1886 to 1900 under the reign of Sultan Hassan I. Rottembourg refers to Walter Rottemburg, the German engineer who oversaw the fort's construction.

Opening 

The National Photography Museum was inaugurated January 14, 2020. Mehdi Qutbi, president of the National Museums Foundation in Morocco, which created the museum, said in a statement to the press: "In this space, Fort Rottembourg, situated next to a low-income neighborhood, we attempt to deliver a message that says that culture must be accessible to every Moroccan."

He also said that the museum's inauguration corresponded with the directives of King Muhammad VI, namely the democratization of culture.

Inaugural exhibition
The Moroccan photographer Yoriyas organized the museum's inaugural exhibition. Sourtna (our image) presented some of Morocco's photographers "of today and of tomorrow." In a statement to the press, Yoriyas said: "I'm convinced that visual development plays a part in the socio-economic development of a country. For me, this here means that Morocco is capable of representing itself in images, that we are capable of producing images, of defending them, of sharing them, of showing them and of seeing them."

This exhibition featured works by Zakaria Ait Wakrim, Abderrahman Amazzal, Hamza Ben Rachad, Walid Bendra, Déborah Benzaquen, Lhoucine Boubelrhiti, Mourad Fedouache, M'hammed Kilito, Ismail Zaidy (L4artiste), Mehdy Mariouch, Amine Oulmakki, Ali ElMadani (Rwinalife), Fatimazohra Serri, Style Beldi, Yassine Toumi, and Yoriyas.

See also 

 House of Photography of Marrakech
 Category:Moroccan photographers

References 

Photography museums and galleries in Morocco
Museums in Morocco
Forts in Morocco